Elektra Luxx is a 2010 comedy film directed and written by Sebastian Gutierrez featuring Carla Gugino. The film is a sequel to the ensemble comedy Women in Trouble. The film premiered at the South by Southwest Film Festival in 2010, where it was acquired by Sony Pictures, and it was released to the rest of the country on March 11, 2011.

It was shown on UK TV on February 28, 2011.

Plot
Pregnant porn star Elektra Luxx is trying to make a living teaching sex classes to housewives. But her life is thrown into disarray when a flight attendant with ties to Elektra's past approaches her for a favor. Chaos ensues as fiancés, private investigators, a twin sister and even the Virgin Mary force her to face up to an unexpected series of decisions and revelations in her life.

The film ends with the trailer for Elektra's farewell film, the Spaghetti Western spoof Even Reverse Cowgirls Get the Blues.

Cast
 Carla Gugino as Elektra Luxx
 Timothy Olyphant as Dellwood Butterworth, private eye
 Joseph Gordon-Levitt as Bert (Roberto) Rodriguez, sex blogger, En Pelotas magazine
 Malin Åkerman as Trixie, checkout girl and friend of Bert's
 Adrianne Palicki as Holly Rocket, (former) adult film actress, Bambi's best friend
 Emmanuelle Chriqui as Bambi Lindberg, call girl, Holly's best friend / Lupita, Bambi's grandmother in Venezuela
 Emma Bell as Eleanore Linbrook, Elektra's neighbor & Rebecca's daughter
 Vincent Kartheiser as Jimmy, Eleanore's husband
 Marley Shelton as Cora, flight attendant
 Justin Kirk as Benjamin, Cora's fiancé
 Josh Brolin as Nick Chapel, (deceased) rock star
 Kathleen Quinlan as Mrs. Turner, one of Elektra's students / Rebecca Linbrook, writer
 Isabella Gutierrez as Charlotte, 13-year-old girl, daughter of Doris & Addy Hunter (see previous film)
 Amy Rosoff as Olive Rodriguez, Bert's sister
 Christine Lakin as Venus Azucar, porn star
 Melissa Ordway as Sabrina Capri, adult film actress
 Julianne Moore as the Virgin Mary (uncredited cameo)
 Rya Kihlstedt as Rita, barmaid from previous film (uncredited)
 Ermahn Ospina as Jimmy Cojones, adult film star
 Jake Hames as Thief #1, adult film actor
 Patrick Caberty as Thief #2, adult film actor
 Lucy Punch as Dolores, one of Elektra's students
 Susie Goliti as Maria, one of Elektra's students
 Matt Gerald as Michael Ortiz, man in restaurant with Bambi & Holly
 John Colella as George, man in restaurant with Bambi & Holly
 Gabriel Gutierrez as "The Walton Kid", Bert's cameraman in one scene
 Eric Stoltz as Dolores' fiancé (deleted scene)

Sequel
Sebastian Gutierrez planned a third installment tentatively titled Women in Ecstasy, which will feature Carla Gugino, Adrianne Palicki, Emmanuelle Chriqui, Joseph Gordon-Levitt, and several cast members returning from Women in Trouble.

References

External links
 
 
 Elektra Luxx's blog entry about Women in Trouble, from a promotional blog for Women in Trouble and related films

2010 films
2010s English-language films
American sex comedy films
American independent films
2010s sex comedy films
2010 independent films
Films directed by Sebastian Gutierrez
Films about pornography
2010 comedy films
2010s American films